The Czech Rally Championship is a rallying series based in the Czech Republic. The first championship was run in 1994.

Czech Rally Championship

Champions

Multiple wins by individual

Multiple wins by car manufacturer

Czech Sprintrally Championship

Multiple wins by individual

Multiple wins by car manufacturer

References

External links
Rally at autoklub.cz

 
Recurring sporting events established in 1994
1994 establishments in the Czech Republic
Rally